Barry Stanley Metcalfe (28 September 1935 – 3 April 1980) was an Australian rules footballer who played a game with Hawthorn in the VFL and spent the early 1960s at Claremont.

Metcalfe, who was used mainly as a wingman, played his first and only game for Hawthorn in the club's 1957 away game against Carlton at Princes Park. One of four Hawthorn players to debut that day, Metcalfe was on the bench and did not take to the field. When teammate Len Crane was appointed captain-coach of VFA club Mordialloc in 1958, Metcalfe joined him for the season. He represented the Association at the 1958 Melbourne Carnival and he was selected to the All-Australian team.

After not playing top level Australian rules football in 1959 he moved to Western Australia and signed up with Claremont where he would make 55 senior appearances, as well as playing three games for the Western Australian interstate team.

References

External links

Barry Metcalfe's playing statistics from The VFA Project
Barry Metcalfe's playing statistics from WAFL Footy Facts

1935 births
Australian rules footballers from Victoria (Australia)
Hawthorn Football Club players
Claremont Football Club players
Mordialloc Football Club players
All-Australians (1953–1988)
1980 deaths